The genealogy of musical genres is the pattern of  musical genres that have contributed to the development of new genres.  Evolution in musical instruments
in technology and in culture can influence the evolution of musical genres.

Genealogical charts or family trees of musical genres show how new genres have emerged from existing genres and how multiple genres have contributed to a new genre. Since music can be endlessly broken down into smaller and smaller categories, a genealogical chart will usually focus on one major genre and its different strains. For instance, jazz is considered to be a genre with many subgenres, including New Orleans jazz, ragtime, swing, bebop, free jazz, and Latin jazz. How these developed out of one another is shown in a genealogical chart, often with major figures or innovators of each subgenre.

A genealogy of genres may also incorporate several major genres, such as jazz, rock and roll and folk music.

The family tree of music can also be explored by starting at the Wikipedia article for a given genre, and clicking on the items in the stylistic origins, subgenres, derivative forms, and fusion genres sections of the genre infobox. See also a dynamic, interactive view of "The Genealogy and History of Popular Music Genres from Origin 'Til Present, 1870-2016" by MusicMap.

See also
 Ishkur's Guide to Electronic Music
 List of music genres
 List of musical topics

Notes

External links
 Musicalized - The Genealogy and History of Popular Music Genres
 Map of Metal
 Algorithmically-generated musical genre-space, for more than 4000 genres on Spotify

Music genres